The East Second Street Commercial Historic District is a small historic district in Winona, Minnesota, United States.  It comprises 14 contributing properties mostly built in the late 1860s.  The district was listed on the National Register of Historic Places in 1991 for its state-level significance in the themes of architecture and commerce.  It was nominated for being one of the few surviving remnants of the original business district of a Minnesota river town, and for being a symbol of Winona's swift growth as a lumber and grain trade center.

See also
 National Register of Historic Places listings in Winona County, Minnesota

References

External links

Buildings and structures in Winona, Minnesota
Commercial buildings on the National Register of Historic Places in Minnesota
Historic districts on the National Register of Historic Places in Minnesota
Gothic Revival architecture in Minnesota
Italianate architecture in Minnesota
National Register of Historic Places in Winona County, Minnesota